Zophina is a genus of flies in the family Tabanidae.

Species
Zophina eiseni (Townsend, 1895)

References

Tabanidae
Brachycera genera
Diptera of North America
Taxa named by Cornelius Becker Philip